Causantín or Constantine of Fife (floruit 1095–1128) is the first man known for certain to have been Mormaer of Fife.

Ancestry
Very little is known about Causantín's life and reign as Mormaer of Fife. His father, for instance, is not known by name. He may have been the son or grandson of the Mac Duib who gave rise to William Shakespeare's character Macduff; the latter being the son of Giric, son of Cináed mac Duib, king of Alba (997–1005). His role as a senior lawman makes it likely that he spent some time in his early life at a native Scottish law school, but this is simply reasoned conjecture.

Historical significance
Causantín's first appearance in history is a charter dated to 1095 when he appears as Constantinus filius Magduffe. The historian John Bannerman suggests that this represents a translation of Causantín mac meic Duib. Here, mac meic means grandson, or ancestor, in the same way that the Irish used Ua. The mac meic formula can be shown in Ireland. The Annals of Ulster (s.a. 1028), for instance, used this formula where they would later use Ua. If Bannerman's suggestion is correct, the charter is calling Causantin the "descendant of Dub" rather than a son of a man with the name MacDuib (=Clan MacDuff). Similar examples can, again, be seen for the more extensive evidence offered by contemporary Ireland. For example, the Annals of Ulster style Tadg, son of Muiredach, as Mac Carthaig, but it was Tadg's grandfather (and Muiredach's father) who was called Carthach. By comparison, the Annals of Innisfallen call the same man mac meic Carthaig. Staying in Ireland, the Kings of Cenél nEógain call themselves Meic Lochlainn. One is called Conchobar mac Meic Lochlainn;<ref>Annals of Ulster, s.a. 1128.3, here.</ref> This very same kindred were also known as the Uí Lochlainn (AU, s.a. 1102 & 1109).

Offices held
In the 1128, in the fourth year of the reign of King David I of Scotland, Causantín appears as Magnus Judex in Scotia, "High Brithem" of Scotland north of the river Forth, an office held to be the Gaelic precursor to what would become the Justiciarship of Scotia. In this role, he appears alongside the Judex Máel Domnaich mac Meic Bethad (Maldoven son of Macbeth) as arbitrator in a land dispute between a knight called Robert of Burgon (aka Robert the Burgundian, who owned the estate of Lochore, which bordered the disputed territory), and the Céli Dé of St Serf's Inch. In this case, both Causantín and Máel Domnaich chose to defer to the superior legal wisdom of another Judex, Dubgall mac Mocche (Dufgal son of Mochta(?)). Causantín appears in a charter of King David's, dated 1126, giving confirmation of the rights of Dunfermline Priory and promoting it to Abbey status. His name occurs as a witness, alongside bishops John of Glasgow, Robert of St Andrews, Cormac of Dunkeld, Gregoir of Moray, Mac Bethad of Rosemarkie, and mormaers Máel Ísu of Strathearn, Ruadrí of Mar, Matad of Atholl, as well as his kinsman, Gille Míchéil, chief of Clann meic Duib and others. It so happens that Causantín appears to have gotten involved in several disputes with the said monastery, and he is alleged to have withheld lands around Kirkcaldy which had been granted to the monastery.

He appears to have been dead by 1130, when another member of the Mac Duib kindred, the Gille Míchéil who appeared alongside Causantín in the charter of 1126, is ruling as mormaer; although the latter may have been using the title comes (mormaer) as early as 1126, and had been using the style Mac Duib since at least 1126. Donnchad I, who succeeded Gille Mícheil, may have been Causantín's son.

Notes

Bibliography
 Bannerman, John, "The Kings Poet and the Inauguration of Alexander III", in The Scottish Historical Review, 68 (1989)
 Bannerman, John, "MacDuff of Fife," in A. Grant & K. Stringer (eds.) Medieval Scotland: Crown, Lordship and Community, Essays Presented to G.W.S. Barrow,  (Edinburgh, 1993), pp. 20–38
 Barrow, G.W.S., "The Judex", in G.W.S. Barrow (ed.), The Kingdom of the Scots, (Edinburgh, 2003), pp. 57–67
 Barrow, G.W.S., "The Justiciar", in G.W.S. Barrow (ed.), The Kingdom of the Scots, (Edinburgh, 2003), pp. 68–111
 Broun, Dauvit, "Anglo-French acculturation", in Brendan Smith (ed.), Britain and Ireland, 900-1300, (Cambridge, 1999), pp. 135–53
 Lawrie, Sir Archibald, Early Scottish Charters Prior to A.D. 1153, (Glasgow, 1905)
 Oram, Richard, David: The King Who Made Scotland, (Gloucestershire, 2004)
 Paul, James Balfour, The Scots Peerage'', Vol. VI, (Edinburgh, 1909)

External links
 Annals of Innisfallen
 Annals of Ulster

|-

|-

Clan MacDuff
People from Fife
11th-century births
12th-century deaths
Mormaers of Fife
11th-century mormaers
12th-century mormaers